Officer Thirteen is a 1932 American crime film directed by George Melford and starring Monte Blue, Lila Lee and Charles Delaney. The film features an early performance from the future star Mickey Rooney in a supporting role. As of September 6, 2012, the film is in public domain.

Plot
After his partner is killed in the line of duty, a policeman quits the force and vows to hunt down the group responsible.

Cast
Monte Blue as Tom Burke  
Lila Lee as Doris Dane  
Charles Delaney as Sandy Malone  
Robert Ellis as Jack Blake  
Frances Rich as Joan Thorpe  
Joseph W. Girard as Chief of Police Kramer  
Seena Owen as Trixi Du Bray  
Mickey Rooney as Buddy Malone  
Jackie Searl as Sammy  
Lloyd Ingraham as Judge Dane 
Florence Roberts as Granny  
George Humbert as Fruit Vendor  
Dot Meyberg as Dolores  
Charles O'Malley as Pete Billings  
Allan Cavan as Police Captain Reed  
Edward Cooper as Rogers, the Dane Butler

References

External links

1932 crime films
1930s English-language films
American crime films
Films directed by George Melford
American black-and-white films
1930s American films